Sydbank Arena (formerly known as Kolding Hallerne and Tre-For Arena) is an indoor sports arena in Kolding, Denmark primarily used for handball. The arena has a capacity of 5,001 spectators and is home to Danish Handball League team KIF Kolding, one of the most successful teams in the history of Danish handball.

History
It was built in 1996 and expanded in 2015. It represents the largest part of the hall complex  The complex is located in the southern part of Kolding and consists of 3 sports halls, 5 handball courts, 10 bowling alleys, meeting facilities, hotel and a restaurant.

In December 2015, the venue was used for the 2015 World Women's Handball Championship. In December 2020 the venue is going to be used for the 2020 European Women's Handball Championship

See also
List of indoor arenas in Denmark
List of indoor arenas in Nordic countries

References

External links

  

Handball venues in Denmark
Indoor arenas in Denmark
Badminton venues
Badminton in Denmark
Sports venues completed in 1996
1996 establishments in Denmark